NBC 24 may refer to one of the following television stations in the United States:

Current
KNVN, Chico-Redding, California
KSEE, Fresno, California
WNWO-TV, Toledo, Ohio

Former
KFTA-TV, Fort Smith, Arkansas (affiliated with NBC from 1980 to 2008; now affiliated with Fox)
WHTV, Meridian, Mississippi (affiliated with NBC via WTVA in Tupelo, Mississippi; now WMDN, a CBS affiliate)